Elmsett Park Wood is an  biological Site of Special Scientific Interest east of Elmsett in Suffolk.

This coppice with standards site has diverse woodland types and ground flora. Plants indicative of ancient woodland include nettle-leaved bellflower, wood spurge, butterfly orchid and the uncommon spurge laurel.

The site is private property with no public access.

References

Sites of Special Scientific Interest in Suffolk
Babergh District